was a Japanese wrestler. He competed in the men's freestyle welterweight at the 1936 Summer Olympics.

References

External links
 

1912 births
Year of death missing
Japanese male sport wrestlers
Olympic wrestlers of Japan
Wrestlers at the 1936 Summer Olympics
Place of birth missing
20th-century Japanese people